The Fantastic Jazz Harp of Dorothy Ashby is an album by jazz harpist Dorothy Ashby recorded in 1965 and released on the Atlantic label.

Reception

Allmusic reviewed the album awarding it 3½ stars stating "On 1965's The Fantastic Jazz Harp of Dorothy Ashby, the harpist is joined by bassist Richard Davis, drummer Grady Tate, percussionist Willie Bobo, and a sporadic horn section on four Ashby originals and six standards".

Track listing 
All compositions by Dorothy Ashby except as indicated
 "Flighty" - 3:30   
 "Essence of Sapphire" - 3:14   
 "Why Did You Leave Me" - 2:58   
 "I Will Follow You" (Jerry Herman) - 3:08   
 "What Am I Here For" (Duke Ellington, Frankie Laine) - 2:21   
 "House of the Rising Sun" (Traditional) - 3:01   
 "Invitation" (Bronisław Kaper, Paul Francis Webster) - 2:59   
 "Nabu Corfa" - 3:47   
 "Feeling Good" (Anthony Newley, Leslie Bricusse) - 5:15   
 "Dodi Li" (Traditional) - 2:18

Personnel 
Dorothy Ashby - harp
Jimmy Cleveland, Quentin Jackson, Sonny Russo, Tony Studd - trombone (tracks 3, 5, 6, 8, 9 & 10)
Richard Davis - bass
Grady Tate - drums
Willie Bobo - percussion (tracks 1 & 4-10)

Production
Arif Mardin and Ollie McLaughlin - producers
Tom Dowd - engineer

References

External links
A Dorothy Ashby Discography

Dorothy Ashby albums
1965 albums
Atlantic Records albums
Albums produced by Arif Mardin